This is a list of lost inventions.

Lost inventions
 Artificial petrifaction of human cadavers invented by Girolamo Segato
 Greek fire
 Panjagan

Questionable examples

 Archimedes' heat ray
 Angel Light
 Flexible glass
 The Glass Flowers at Harvard, widely believed to be unreproducible and made by secret and now lost technique or equipment, but actually attributable to the extraordinary skill of the craftsmen.
 Iron pillar of Delhi, notable for the rust-resistant composition of the metals used in its construction
 Mithridate
 Sloot Digital Coding System
 Starlite
 Teleforce, Tesla's particle beam weapon

See also 
 Out-of-place artifact

References